George Peter Bolgar (born 1935) is a British television and radio announcer. He announced for BBC Television from 1967 to 1995, and since then, he has announced for the BBC World Service.

Biography
Bolgar was educated at Durham University (King's College) and then the Royal College of Music in London, where he met his future wife Angela Piper, who studied at the Royal Academy of Music.

References

1936 births
Alumni of the Royal College of Music
Radio and television announcers
Living people
Alumni of King's College, Newcastle